Bruce Price (December 12, 1845 – May 29, 1903) was an American  architect and an innovator in the Shingle Style. The stark geometry and compact massing of his cottages in Tuxedo Park, New York, influenced Modernist architects, including Frank Lloyd Wright and Robert Venturi.

He also designed Richardsonian Romanesque institutional buildings, Beaux-Arts mansions, and Manhattan skyscrapers. In Canada, he designed Châteauesque railroad stations and grand hotels for the Canadian Pacific Railway, including Windsor Station in Montreal and Château Frontenac in Quebec City.

Life and career

Price was born in Cumberland, Maryland, the son of William and Marian Bruce Price. He studied for a short time at Princeton University. After four years of internship in the office of the Baltimore architects Niernsee & Neilson (1864–68), he began his professional work in Baltimore with Ephraim Francis Baldwin as a partner. Following a brief study trip to Europe, he opened an office in Wilkes-Barre, Pennsylvania, where he practiced from 1873 to 1876.

He settled in New York City in 1877, where he worked on a series of domestic projects. These culminated in the design and layout of the exclusive 7,000-acre planned community of Tuxedo Park (1885–86), created by Pierre Lorillard IV. The striking buildings Price designed there, with their severe geometry, compact massing and axial plans, were highly influential in the architectural profession. Eight of Price's houses – including five from Tuxedo Park – were among the one hundred buildings selected for George William Sheldon's landmark survey of American domestic architecture: Artistic Country-Seats (1886–87). The most famous of these, the Pierre Lorillard V cottage ("Cottage G"), though demolished and now known only through photographs, remains an icon of American architecture. Price's daughter wrote in 1911:
"In beginning Tuxedo, the architect's idea was to fit buildings with the surrounding woods, and the gate-lodge and keep were built of graystone with as much moss and lichen as possible. The shingled cottages were stained with the color of the woods—russets and grays and dull reds—ugly to the taste of a quarter century later, though this treatment did much to neutralize the newness of the buildings—Old World and tradition-haunted as it looks, it is new, incredibly new."

Among the Manhattan office buildings he designed were the American Surety Building, the St. James Building, the Bank of the Metropolis and the International Bank. He also collaborated with sculptor Daniel Chester French on the Richard Morris Hunt Memorial (1898) in Central Park. He designed a lecture hall and a dormitory at Yale University. His grandest residential commission was Georgian Court, the neo-Georgian estate of George Jay Gould I in Lakewood, New Jersey.

Price invented, patented, and built the parlor bay-window cars for the Pennsylvania Railroad and the Boston and Albany Railroad. This work prompted the Canadian Pacific Railways to consider his portfolio. He designed the Château Frontenac in Quebec City for the Canadian Pacific (arguably the structure Price is most identified with), as well as the first Banff Springs Hotel in Alberta, and many other hotels and stations.

He was a Fellow of the American Institute of Architects (1890) and belonged to the Architectural League of New York. In 1900, he entered into a partnership with French architect Jules Henri de Sibour, who had earlier worked in his office. The firm continued to use the name "Bruce Price & de Sibour" until 1908, five years after Price's death.

In 1871, Price married Josephine Lee, the daughter of a Wilkes-Barre coal baron. They had two children: Emily Price Post, who became a novelist and the American authority on etiquette, and William, who died in infancy. Price is buried, along with his wife and son, in Hollenback Cemetery in Wilkes-Barre, Pennsylvania.

Selected works

United States

 10 East Chase Street, Baltimore, Maryland (c. 1870). 
 Coryell Apartment Building, 21 East 21st Street, Manhattan, New York (1878).
 James Alfred Roosevelt Estate, Cove Neck, New York (1881).
 "Cleftstone" (Charles T. How cottage), Bar Harbor, Maine (1881). Now Cleftstone Manor Hotel.
 "Seacroft", Rumson, NJ (1881)
 "Far Niente" (William B. Rice cottage), Bar Harbor, Maine (1882, demolished 1943).
 J. M. Wayne Neff residence, Cincinnati, Ohio (1882, demolished). Listed in Sheldon's Artistic Country-Seats (1886–87).
 "Seaverge" (George F. Baker residence), Monmouth Beach, New Jersey (c. 1884, demolished). Listed in Sheldon's Artistic Country-Seats (1886–87).
 Cordelia Sterling residence, Stratford, Connecticut (1886). Listed in Sheldon's Artistic Country-Seats (1886–87).
 Osborn Hall, Yale University, New Haven, Connecticut (1887–88, demolished 1926).
 Welch Hall, Yale University, New Haven, Connecticut (1891).
 Main Building, Hotchkiss School, Lakeville, Connecticut (1892, demolished 1970).
 Hotchkiss Library of Sharon, Sharon, Connecticut (1893)
 Elizabeth Train Station, Elizabeth, New Jersey (1893–94). Built as Central Railroad of New Jersey Depot.
 American Surety Building, 100 Broadway, Manhattan, New York (1894, altered). Architect Herman Lee Meader widened the building and added additional stories in 1922.
 "The Turrets" (John J. Emery house), Bar Harbor, Maine (1895). Now part of College of the Atlantic.
 St. James Building, 1133 Broadway, Manhattan, New York (1896).
 "Georgian Court" (George Jay Gould I mansion), Lakewood, New Jersey (1896). Now Georgian Court University.
 Richard Morris Hunt Memorial, Fifth Avenue between 70th & 71st Streets, Central Park, New York City (1898), with sculptor Daniel Chester French.
 Daniel B. Wesson residence, Springfield, Massachusetts (1898, destroyed by fire 1966).
 Old Washington County Library, Hagerstown, Maryland (1900).
 Whittier Hall Dormitories, Teachers College, Columbia University, Manhattan, New York (1901), with J. M. Darragh.
 Audrain Building, 220-30 Bellevue Avenue, Newport, Rhode Island (1902).
 Bank of the Metropolis, 31 Union Square West, Manhattan, New York (1902–03).
 Northfield Chateau, Northfield, Massachusetts (1903, demolished 1963).

Tuxedo Park, New York
 Tuxedo Park Post Office, Tuxedo Park (1885).
 Gate-Lodge and Keep, Tuxedo Park (1885–86).
 Erie Railroad Tuxedo Park Station, Tuxedo Park (1885).
 "Cottage G" (Pierre Lorillard V Cottage), Tuxedo Park (1885–86, demolished). Listed in Sheldon's Artistic Country-Seats (1886–87).
 William Kent Cottage, Tuxedo Park (1885–86, demolished). Listed in Sheldon's Artistic Country-Seats (1886–87). Vincent Scully argues that Frank Lloyd Wright modeled his Oak Park house and studio after this and the Chanler cottage.
 W. Chanler Cottage, Tuxedo Park (1885–86, altered). Scully identifies the client as "W. Chandler," but it was likely Winthrop Astor Chanler.
 The Tuxedo Club, Tuxedo Park (1886, demolished 1927).
 Pierre Lorillard IV Cottage, Tuxedo Park (1886, altered). Listed in Sheldon's Artistic Country-Seats (1886–87).
 Henry I. Barbey Cottage, Tuxedo Park (1886, demolished). Listed in Sheldon's Artistic Country-Seats (1886–87).
 Travis Van Buren Cottage, Tower Hill Road, Tuxedo Park (1886, altered beyond recognition). Listed in Sheldon's Artistic Country-Seats (1886–87).
 Francis D. Carley Cottage, West Lake Road, Tuxedo Park (1886, moved from original site 1896).
 Tuxedo Park School (first building), Tuxedo Park (c. 1887, demolished).
 M. G. Barnwell Stable, Clubhouse Road, Tuxedo Park (1889–90).
 Meta K. Cruger Cottage, Tower Hill Road, Tuxedo Park (c. 1890).
 Japanese Cottage, 16 Summit Road, Tuxedo Park (1891).
 Our Lady of Mount Carmel Roman Catholic Church, Route 17, Tuxedo Park (1895, burned 1897).
 Bruce Price Cottage, Pepperidge Road, Tuxedo Park (1897).
 Voss Cottage, Pepperidge Road, Tuxedo Park (c. 1897). One of four cottages Price built for rental. Samuel Clemens rented it in 1908.
 Emily Post cottage, Tuxedo Park (c. 1897). One of four cottages Price built for rental. His daughter Emily inherited it.
 Addison Cammack House, Tuxedo Park (1900).
 Price Collier House, West Lake Road, Tuxedo Park (1900).
 Tuxedo Park Association Offices, Route 17, Tuxedo Park (1900).
 Tuxedo Stores (Business Block), Route 17, Tuxedo Park (c. 1900).
 Tuxedo Park Library, 227 Route 17, Tuxedo Park (1901).
 Methodist Episcopal Church, 7 Hospital Road, Tuxedo Park (1902). Now Tuxedo Historical Society.
 R. M. Gillespie House, Tuxedo Park (1903).

Canada
 Windsor Station, Montreal, Quebec (1887–89).
 Banff Springs Hotel, Banff National Park, Alberta (1888, demolished 1925). Price's wood-and-shingle hotel was replaced by one of stone and concrete.
 James Ross House, Montreal, Quebec (1892). Now known as Old Chancellor Day Hall at the McGill University Faculty of Law.
 Château Frontenac, Quebec City, Quebec (1893).
 Place Viger, Montreal, Quebec (1897). A combined railroad station and hotel.

Gallery

See also 
Canada's railway hotels
Canadian Pacific hotels
Canadian Pacific Railway

References 
 Samuel Hulet Graybill, Jr., Bruce Price, American Architect (1824-1903) (PhD dissertation, Yale University, May 1957).
 Vincent J. Scully, Jr., The Shingle Style and The Stick Style (Revised Edition) (Yale University Press, 1971).

External links

Bruce Price from Philadelphia Architects and Buildings.

Architects from Maryland
Architects from Baltimore
Architects from Pennsylvania
Architects from New York City
19th-century American architects
American railway architects
1845 births
1903 deaths
Architects from Cumberland, Maryland
Fellows of the American Institute of Architects